MV Tampa was a roll-on/roll-off container ship completed in 1984 by Hyundai Heavy Industries Co., Ltd. in South Korea for the Norway-based firm, Wilhelmsen Lines Shipowning.

In 2001, the vessel was at the centre of the Tampa affair when its crew rescued 433 refugees in international waters, but the Australian government refused permission for them to disembark on Christmas Island.

Service history
Tampa was launched in late 1983. It was a so called ro-ro ship. Ro-ro is an abbreviation of roll-on/roll off. These ships are cargo shipsdesigned to carry wheeled cargo, such as cars, motorcycles, trucks, semi-trailer trucks, buses, trailers, and railroad cars, that are driven on and off the ship on their own wheels or using a platform vehicle, such as a self-propelled modular transporter. This is in contrast to lift-on/lift-off (LoLo) vessels, which use a crane to load and unload cargo.

Tampa affair

In August 2001, under Captain Arne Rinnan, a diplomatic dispute brewed between Australia, Norway, and Indonesia after Tampa rescued 438 Afghans from a distressed fishing vessel in international waters. The Afghans wanted passage to nearby Christmas Island. The Australian government sought to prevent this by refusing Tampa entry into Australian waters, insisting on their disembarkment elsewhere, and deploying the Special Air Service Regiment to board the ship.

At the time of the incident, Tampa carried cargo worth , and 27 crew. The crew of Tampa later received the Nansen Refugee Award for 2002 from the United Nations High Commissioner for Refugees (UNHCR) for their efforts to follow international principles of saving people in distress at sea.

Cocaine smuggling bust
In October 2006, Tampa was one of two Wilhelmsen ships involved in a cocaine-smuggling operation intercepted by the New Zealand Customs Service and the Australian Federal Police.  of cocaine was allegedly attached to the side of the two cargo ships bound for Australia in purpose-built metal pods, although New Zealand authorities stated they did not believe the ship's crew or owners were involved.

See also
 
 Ruddock v Vadarlis

References

Bibliography 
 David Marr, Maria Wilkinson: Dark Victory - How a government lied its way to political triumph. Allen & Unwin 2004, .

Further reading
 Decision of Justice North, Federal Court of Australia 11 September 2001
 Decision of Full Court overturning decision of Justice North, 18 September 2001
David Marr & Marian Wilkinson Dark Victory. 

News.com.au: Reflections by Julian Burnside on Tampa with public comments published to coincide with 5-year anniversary of the event
Daniel Ross, Violent Democracy, ch. 5.
 Mary Elzabeth Crock: In the Wake of the Tampa: Conflicting Visions of International Refugee Law in the Management of Refugee Flows. Pacific Rim Journal of Law and Policy, Vol. 12, No. 1, pp. 49–95, 2003.
 Peter Mares: Borderline: Australia's Response to Refugees and Asylum Seekers in the Wake of the Tampa. UNSW Press 2002, .

External links
 NauruWire, an Australia based site Update on status of detainees. Accessed 25 June 2005.

2001 in Australia
Container ships
History of immigration to Australia
International maritime incidents
Law of the sea
Maritime incidents in 2001
Ships built by Hyundai Heavy Industries Group
1983 ships
Wallenius Wilhelmsen Logistics
Ro-ro ships
Articles containing video clips